Blind Love may refer to:

Films
Blind Love (1912 film), an American drama film directed by D. W. Griffith
Blind Love (2015 film), a documentary film
Blind Love (2016 film), a Pakistani romance film

Music
Blind Love (album), by Ratcat, 1991
"Blind Love" (song), by CNBLUE, 2013
"Blind Love", a song by Tom Waits from Rain Dogs, 1985
The Blind Love, a British band co-founded by Christian Burns

Other uses
"Blind Love" (Grimm), a TV episode
Blind Love (novel), an unfinished novel by Wilkie Collins

See also
Blind Loves, a 2008 Slovak film